2-polyprenyl-6-hydroxyphenol methylase (ubiG (gene), ubiG methyltransferase, 2-octaprenyl-6-hydroxyphenol methylase) is an enzyme with systematic name S-adenosyl-L-methionine:3-(all-trans-polyprenyl)benzene-1,2-diol 2-O-methyltransferase. This enzyme catalyses the following chemical reaction

 S-adenosyl-L-methionine + 3-(all-trans-polyprenyl)benzene-1,2-diol  S-adenosyl-L-homocysteine + 2-methoxy-6-(all-trans-polyprenyl)phenol

UbiG catalyses both methylation steps in ubiquinone biosynthesis in Escherichia coli.

References

External links 
 

EC 2.1.1